Matthew Barnett Jackson (born June 24, 1992) is an American paralegal and former contestant on the syndicated game show Jeopardy! who is known for winning 13 consecutive games and earning $413,612, the ninth-highest games streak all-time as of April 22, 2022. His 13-episode streak ended with a loss on October 14, 2015. Jackson's total winnings place him tenth on the all-time money-winning list in regular (non-tournament) games as of November 27, 2022.

Early life and education
Jackson grew up in Washington, D.C. and attended Georgetown Day School. He is the son of Amy Berman Jackson, a judge on the United States District Court for the District of Columbia, and lawyer Darryl Jackson. His mother is Jewish and his father is African-American and Christian. His middle name comes from his maternal grandfather, Barnett Berman, a physician at Johns Hopkins University whom Jackson cited as an early influence in becoming well-read.

Jackson majored in philosophy at Yale University and graduated in 2014.

Career 
At Yale, Jackson was a key player on the university's quiz bowl team, which won several national tournaments, including Academic Competition Federation nationals in 2011 and 2012 and the National Academic Quiz Tournaments Intercollegiate Championship Tournament 2013 (Division I); he served as president of the Partnership for Academic Competition Excellence (PACE), a nonprofit promoting the spread of quiz bowl, in 2014–15.

Jackson works as a paralegal in D.C.

Jeopardy!

Jackson was encouraged to apply for the show by his friend Sam Spaulding, who won $50,000 after finishing second in the fall 2010 College Championship. After two unsuccessful attempts to enter the college tournament, he auditioned for the regular show in 2014 and was selected as a contestant. Jackson said that he repeated, "I am not throwin' away my shot," a line from the musical Hamilton, for inspiration while preparing for the show. He studied by reading previous champions' books on the experience, such as Ken Jennings’s Brainiac and Bob Harris's Prisoner of Trebekistan.

Jackson initially drew attention for his slow smile while being introduced at the beginning of each show. After his first victory, he began using his fingers to display the number of wins in his streak. Jackson also became known for his buzzer speed and for quickly moving onto the next question after giving a correct response. In his third game, when Jackson said "Boom!" after correctly answering a Daily Double, fans and media quickly proclaimed the exclamation his signature catchphrase, but he never repeated it. 

Jackson's 13-episode streak ended with a loss on October 14, 2015. In his 14 episodes he earned $413,612. At the time his 13-win streak was the fourth highest in Jeopardy! regular-play history, trailing only Ken Jennings (74 wins in 2004), Julia Collins (20 in 2014), and David Madden (19 in 2005). He was also fourth-highest in total regular-play earnings. In 2019, first James Holzhauer had a 32-game winning streak, moving Jackson to fifth place in both consecutive games won and total regular-play earnings, then Jason Zuffranieri had a 19-game winning streak, moving Jackson to sixth place in both consecutive games won and total regular-play earnings. In 2021, Matt Amodio had a 38-game winning streak, bumping Jackson to seventh place in consecutive days won and total money earned. In 2022, first Amy Schneider had a 40-game winning streak, moving Jackson to eighth place, then Mattea Roach surpassed Jackson with 23 wins, moving Jackson to ninth place in both consecutive games and regular play earnings.

Jackson returned in November 2015 for the Jeopardy! Tournament of Champions. On the November 11 episode he won his quarterfinal game and moved on to the next round. On the November 18 episode he won his semifinal game to advance to the finals. In the two-day final aired on November 19 and 20, Jackson finished second, behind Alex Jacob, winning $100,000.

Jackson appeared in the show's "All-Star Games", which aired from February 20 to March 5, 2019. His teammates were captain Ken Jennings and 2012 College champion Monica Thieu. The team took second place.

References

1992 births
Jeopardy! contestants
Living people
People from Washington, D.C.
Yale University alumni
African-American Jews
American television personalities
Male television personalities
Georgetown Day School alumni
Paralegals
21st-century American Jews